The Democratic Centre (abbr. ДЦ, DC) was a political party in Serbia. It was founded in 1996 by Dragoljub Mićunović, former president of the Democratic Party (DS) when he left the DS.

At the 2003 Serbian parliamentary election, the party won 5 seats on the list of the Democratic Party. After the elections, it merged into the Democratic Party.

References

1996 establishments in Serbia
Defunct political parties in Serbia
Centrist parties in Serbia 
Democratic Party (Serbia) breakaway groups
Political parties established in 1996
Political parties with year of disestablishment missing